Jo Tae-hun (born 30 June 1991) is a Korean handball player for Doosan and the Korean national team.

He represented Korea at the 2019 World Men's Handball Championship.

References

1991 births
Living people
South Korean male handball players
Handball players at the 2018 Asian Games
Asian Games bronze medalists for South Korea
Asian Games medalists in handball
Medalists at the 2018 Asian Games
21st-century South Korean people